The 1903 Missouri Tigers football team was an American football team that represented the University of Missouri as an independent during the 1903 college football season. The team compiled a 1–7–1 record and was outscored by its opponents by a combined total of 83 to 46. John McLean was the head coach for the first of three seasons. The team played its home games at Rollins Field in Columbia, Missouri.

Schedule

References

Missouri
Missouri Tigers football seasons
Missouri Tigers football